Reik is a surname. Notable people with the surname include:

Haviva Reik (1914–1944), Jewish resistance fighter in World War II
Theodor Reik (1888–1969), Austrian psychoanalyst
Wolf Reik (born 1957), German molecular biologist

See also
Reck
Reiks
Riek

Surnames from given names